Narköy, formerly known as  Nêroassós or Narassa, is a village in the central ilçe (district) of  Niğde Province, Turkey.

The name of the village refers to  Lake Narlı to the northeast of the village. Ancient cave dwellings and ruins around the village and the lake show that the area was inhabited in the medieval age. 

The population of Narköy was 640 as of 2007.

The economy of the village depends on agriculture. Wheat, barley, oat, chickpea and bean are among the main crops of the village. There are poplar trees and orchards around the village. Fruits like apple, pear and apricot are also produced. Apiculture is on the rise.

References

Villages in Niğde Province
Niğde Central District